The Waterfront is a live music venue and nightclub in King Street, Norwich, Norfolk. It is located on the bank of the River Wensum, opposite Norwich Riverside. It has been managed by the Union of UEA Students since 1993. It is not, however, a student club, and entrance is open to the public. The building comprises two floors. The ground floor contains a 700 capacity main room with integral bar, dressing rooms and toilets. The first floor features a 200 capacity room, a café bar and an open plan office.

There is a wide range of live music throughout the year.

The Waterfront, Norwich has hosted bands and artists including Pulp, Radiohead, Nirvana, The Verve, Arctic Monkeys, The Prodigy, Amy Winehouse, Stereophonics, Paul Weller, Buzzcocks, MGMT, Travis, Moby, Ellie Goulding, and Foals.

See also
 Norwich Arts Centre

External links
 Riverside Website

University of East Anglia
Norwich
Music venues in Norfolk